Mimico Centennial Library is a public library in Toronto, Ontario, Canada. It is a branch of the Toronto Public Library system and is located in the neighbourhood of Mimico in the former city of Etobicoke.

Services
Information and reference services 
Access to full text databases 
Community information 
Internet access 
Reader's advisory services 
Programs for children, youth and adults 
 Delivery to homebound individuals
 Interlibrary loan
 Free downloadable audiobooks

History
It began as Mimico Carnegie Library after the Village of Mimico held a plebiscite in 1913 to request funds for a Carnegie Library, several already having been built in Toronto.  Mimico's population was below the threshold set for Carnegie grants but was nevertheless approved and in 1915 the Mimico Carnegie Library opened on Pigeon St (later combined with Stanley Ave.).  In 1917 Mimico became a Town and the town council used the library for its meetings until it purchased the old Mimico Wesleyan Methodist Church on Church St (Royal York Rd) which was vacated by the Methodist Church after the construction of the new United Church.

Mimico's Imperial Order of the Daughters of the Empire placed two plaques in the Library after the First World War to commemorate the town's servicemen; one plaque for all who had fought, the other for Mimico's dead.  In 1966, to celebrate Canada's centenary, the Carnegie Library became the only one of Canada's 42 Carnegie Libraries to be demolished (along with several homes on Stanley Ave. and Station Rd.) and a new 'Centennial Library' was built. The plaques commemorating Mimico's servicemen from the First World War were placed in a new 'Vimy Park' at Queens Ave and Lake Shore Blvd.  In 1967 the Town of Mimico was annexed with the other Lake Shore municipalities, back into Etobicoke which became a Borough.

See also
Mimico
Carnegie Library
Toronto Public Library
Ask Ontario
Ontario Public Libraries

References

External links

Library buildings completed in 1915
Public libraries in Toronto
Etobicoke
Carnegie libraries in Canada
Libraries established in 1915